The 2016 WEC 6 Hours of Mexico was an endurance sports car racing event held at the Autódromo Hermanos Rodríguez, Mexico on 1–3 September 2016. The Autódromo Hermanos Rodríguez round served as the fifth race of the 2016 FIA World Endurance Championship. The race was won by the No. 1 Porsche entered by Porsche Motorsport.

Qualifying

Qualifying result
Pole position winners in each class are marked in bold.

 – No. 98 Aston Martin Racing was excluded from qualifying as the ride car's height was 55mm lower.

Race

Race result
The minimum number of laps for classification (70% of the overall winning car's race distance) was 161 laps. Class winners are denoted in bold.

References 

Mexico
6 Hours of Mexico
6 Hours of Mexico
6 Hours of Mexico